Geissanthus spectabilis is a species of tree in the family Primulaceae. It is endemic to Peru.

References

spectabilis
Endemic flora of Peru